Yergatla is a village in the Nizamabad district in the state of Telangana in India.

References 

Villages in Nizamabad district